The ashy thrush (Geokichla cinerea), also known as the ashy ground-thrush, is a species of bird in the family Turdidae. It is endemic to the Philippines in Luzon and Mindoro. Its natural habitats are tropical moist lowland forests and or tropical moist montane forests. It is threatened by habitat loss, and the illegal wildlife trade.

Description 

EBird describes the bird as "A medium-sized bird of lowland and foothill forest. Forages on the ground. Ashy-gray above with black-and-white bars in the wing and the face. Underparts white, with black spots concentrated in the chest. Similar to White's thrush and Sunda thrush, but smaller, with spots rather than scales below and an obvious black vertical bar through the eye. Song is a simple medium-pitched whistled melody. Also gives harsh grating calls."  

These are ground birds and eat earthworms and other small insects.  

It has been recorded breeding in La Mesa Ecopark where that nest had three chicks

Habitat and conservation status 
It is found in tropical moist primary and secondary forest with a large majority up to 1,100 meters above sea level with a few records up to 1.560.

IUCN has assessed this bird as Vulnerable with the population estimated to consist of 6,000 to 15,000 mature individuals with it believed to be declining. This species' main threat is habitat loss with wholesale clearance of forest habitats as a result of logging, agricultural conversion, road development and mining activities occurring within the range.    It may also suffer from hunting with snares in the Sierra Madre and illicit bird-trapping at Dalton Pass may exert a considerable pressure.

It occurs in the protected areas  Angat Watershed Forest Reserve, Quezon Protected Landscape, Mount Makiling National Park and Northern Sierra Madre Natural Park however, like most areas in the Philippines, protection is lax and deforestation and hunting persist even in these areas.

References

ashy thrush
Birds of Luzon
Birds of Mindoro
Endemic birds of the Philippines
ashy thrush
ashy thrush
ashy thrush
Taxonomy articles created by Polbot